Marion Anderson, O.Ont (born c. 1900, died c. 1960) was a Canadian politician. In 1950, she became the first woman to serve as a First Nations band councillor in Ontario.

Life
An Oji-Cree from the Big Trout Lake band in Kenora District, Anderson worked as a midwife and was renowned for her hunting, fishing and trapping skills. 
She also represented the community on the Northern Nishnawbe Education Council and walked 75 kilometres to Bearskin Lake to represent the community at meetings.

Awards
She was awarded the Order of Ontario in 1998.

References

1900s births
1960s deaths
20th-century Canadian politicians
20th-century Canadian women politicians
20th-century First Nations people
Canadian midwives
Canadian women in municipal politics
First Nations women in politics
Members of the Order of Ontario
Oji-Cree people
Ontario municipal councillors
People from Kenora District
Political office-holders of Indigenous governments in Canada
Women in Ontario politics